Vasyl Vasyltsiv (born 26 June 1987) is a Ukrainian singer and composer.

Vasyl Vasyltsiv was born on 26 June 1987 in Lviv. In spite of his young age, since writing his first song in 2001 Vasyltsiv has released nine albums (as of May 2008). Though only one of them came under official label (Goldenhits) Vasyltsiv is sometimes considered as "the face of Ukrainian underground" and "genius of pure simplicity".

Having graduated with honors as a "performer and orchestra conductor" Vasyltsiv is yet frequently being criticised for tone deafness, lack of vocal abilities and composing talent. While being regarded as simple and naïve, Vasyltsiv's music is distinguished for its harmony and proportion.

Notes

External links 
 MySpace - Vasyl Vasyltsiv
 Last.fm - Vasyl Vasyltsiv

1987 births
Living people
Experimental musicians
Musicians from Lviv
Underground artists
21st-century Ukrainian  male singers